Actinopus princeps is a species of mygalomorph spiders in the family Actinopodidae. It is found in Brazil.

References

princeps
Spiders described in 1917